Ingrid Maria Munneke-Dusseldorp ( Dusseldorp, born 24 April 1946) is a retired Dutch rower who won the European title in single sculls in 1972. Four years later she competed in this event at the 1976 Summer Olympics and finished in fifth place. Her husband Jannes Munneke is also an Olympic rower.

References

1946 births
Living people
Dutch female rowers
Olympic rowers of the Netherlands
Rowers at the 1976 Summer Olympics
Rowers from Amsterdam
European Rowing Championships medalists
World Rowing Championships medalists for the Netherlands
20th-century Dutch women
21st-century Dutch women